Ciniod (Scottish Gaelic: Cináed) was king of the Picts, in modern Scotland, ruling circa 843.  His family's claim may not have been uncontested, and it did not endure. According to the Pictish Chronicle, he was the son of Uurad (also Ferach, Ferech) and brother of king Drest.

843 deaths
Pictish monarchs
9th-century Scottish monarchs
Year of birth unknown